Fake It may refer to:

 Fake it till you make it, a concept that suggests imitating qualities can lead to a realization of those qualities in a person's life
 "Fake It" (Bastille song), a 2016 song by Bastille
 "Fake It" (Seether song), a 2007 song by Seether
 "Fake It" (Tauren Wells song), a 2022 song by Tauren Wells featuring Aaron Cole
 Fake It, a song by Hyomin from her 2014 EP Make Up
 "Fake It", B-side of "Nee" (Perfume song), a 2010 song by Perfume
 Fake It Flowers, a 2020 album by Beabadoobee